The Chicago metropolitan area has an ethnic Chinese population. As of 2010, there are 43,228 Chinese Americans who live in Chicago, 1.6% of the city's population. This population includes native-born Chinese as well as immigrants from Mainland China, Taiwan, Hong Kong and Southeast Asia, and also racially mixed Chinese.

History
In 1869 the first transcontinental railway was completed. By that time the first Chinese arrived in Chicago. Early immigrants from China to Chicago came from the lower classes and lower middle classes. The earliest immigrants were Cantonese. In 1874 the Chinese managed one tea shop and 18 laundry businesses in central Chicago. The 1882 Chinese Exclusion Act passed by the U.S. Congress restricted Chinese immigration and restricted freedom of travel for existing Chinese, forcing those in Chicago to stay put. At that time some Chinese in Chicago were illegal immigrants. The Chinese Inspector of the Department of Labor deported illegal immigrants who were discovered. According to the 1900 U.S. Census, there were 1,462 Chinese in the city. Chuimei Ho and Soo Lon Moy of the Chinatown Museum Foundation wrote that "there must have been others who avoided government notice."

Some Chinese immigration began after the Chinese exclusion laws were repealed in 1943. During the 1950s the Chinese population grew from 3,000 to 6,000. Taiwanese and Hong Kong immigrants settled in Chicago in the 1950s and 1960s. After the People's Republic of China was established in 1949, a new wave of immigrants from the mainland came in the 1950s. The Mandarin-speaking people settled throughout Chicago and the suburbs instead of clustering in the Chinatown area. The 1965 Immigration Act further increased Chinese settlement, with a new wave coming from Mainland China.

By 1970 there were 12,000 Chinese in Chicago. After the Fall of Saigon in the 1970s, a wave of ethnic Chinese came from southeast Asia. A new Chinatown opened in Uptown during that decade, and many Southeast Asian refugees were attracted to this new Chinatown. According to the 1990 U.S. Census there were over 23,000 Chinese in the city of Chicago. In the 2000 U.S. Census there were almost 74,000 Chinese in the Chicago metropolitan area, with 34,000 of them in the City of Chicago.

Demographics
As of 1990 there were about 60,000 ethnic Chinese in the Chicago metropolitan area; of them, about 10,000 Chinese lived in Chinatown's business district and the area south of 26th Street.

As of 1995 almost 35,000 Chinese lived in Chicago, and 10,000 Chinese Americans lived in the area holding the Chinatown. The origins of ethnic Chinese Chicagoans include native-born Chinese as well as immigrants from Mainland China, Taiwan, Hong Kong and Southeast Asia, and also racially mixed Chinese. Around 1995 many new immigrants were from agricultural and blue collar working classes and from better educated professional classes.

 90% of the residents of Chinatown were ethnic Chinese.

Institutions
The Chinese American Museum of Chicago is in Chinatown.
Chinese American Service League is in Chinatown, Chicago.

Media
As of 1995 Chicago had four daily Chinese newspapers. Chinese-Americans who were bilingual in Chinese and English or who knew English but did not know Chinese had a tendency to read English-language American newspapers. In 1995 there were no English-language Chinese-American newspapers that focus on Chinese-American issues in the Chicago area.

In 1983 a Mandarin-language television program opened on Channel 26. In 1989 a Chinese radio station named Global Communication was established.

Education
In 2003 there were 20 Chinese schools in the Chicago area. Around 2003 an increase in immigration and non-Chinese American parents sending adopted Chinese children to Chinese schools caused enrollment figures of Chinese schools in the northwestern suburbs of Chicago to increase.

Religion
Compared to Chinese in China, there is a higher proportion of Christians among the Chinese in Chicago. Chinese Christians operate their own missions. The Chinese Christian Union Church, an interdenominational church, has its main facility on Wentworth Avenue in Chicago and satellite facilities in the suburbs and in Bridgeport. Chinese Catholics, many of whom originate from Hong Kong and had converted to Christianity, attend the St. Marie Incoronata, an Italian Catholic church on Alexander Street. The St. Therese School, founded by the Maryknoll Sisters, was established for the Chinese community.

Christians in the United States attempted to convert Chinese from their native religions after the Chinese began arriving. The earliest recorded Chinese Baptist mission was one that opened on Clark Street, in the Chinese area, in 1878. In the early 20th century, of all cities, Chicago had the largest number of Chinese Sunday schools. In the South Side and West Side of Chicago, these smaller Chinese Sunday schools opened near laundry businesses operated by Chinese. By 1995 these Sunday schools ceased to exist. Franciscan priests and nuns established the first Catholic missions for Chinese people.

Notable residents
 John Chiang
 Ruth Ann Koesun
 Chow Leung
 Chloe Wang (Chloe Bennet)

References

Bibliography
 Ho, Chuimei and Soo Lon Moy (editors) for the Chinatown Museum Foundation. Chinese in Chicago, 1870-1945. Arcadia Publishing, 2005. , 9780738534442.
 Moy, Susan Lee. "The Chinese in Chicago: The First One Hundred Years" (Chapter 13) In: Holli, Melvin G. and Peter d'Alroy Jones (editors). Ethnic Chicago: A Multicultural Portrait. Wm. B. Eerdmans Publishing, 1995. , 9780802870537.

Further reading
 Fan, Tin-chiu. Chinese residents in Chicago. R and E Research Associates, 1974.
 Fan, Ting C. "Chinese Residents in Chicago." Ph.D. diss., University of Chicago. 1926.
 Ling, Huping. Chinese Chicago: Race, Transnational Migration, and Community Since 1870. Stanford University Press, January 18, 2012. , 9780804783361.

External links
 Chinese Mutual Aid Association (CMAA, T: 華人互助會, S: 华人互助会, P: Huárén Hùzhù Huì)
 Chinese Consolidated Benevolent Association of Chicago (CCBA, T: 美國芝城中華會館, S: 美国芝城中华会馆, P: Měiguó Zhī Chéng Zhōnghuá Huìguǎn)
 Chinese American Service League (CASL, T: 華人諮詢服務處, S: 华人谘询服务处, P: Huárén Zīxún Fúwù Chù)
 Organization of Chinese Americans (OCA) Chicago

Chinese
Chicago
Chinese-American history
Chinese
Chinese-American culture in Illinois